Dorothea Lambert Chambers defeated Elizabeth Ryan 6–2, 6–1 in the All Comers' Final, but the reigning champion Suzanne Lenglen defeated Lambert Chambers 6–3, 6–0 in the Challenge Round to win the Ladies' Singles at the 1920 Wimbledon Championships.

Draw

Challenge round

All comers' finals

Top half

Section 1

Section 2

Bottom half

Section 3

Section 4

References

External links

Women's Singles
Wimbledon Championship by year – Women's singles
Wimbledon Championships - Singles
Wimbledon Championships - Singles